Arthur Spencer (born 21 May 1947) is a British sports shooter. He competed in the men's 50 metre free pistol event at the 1984 Summer Olympics.

References

External links
 

1947 births
Living people
British male sport shooters
Olympic shooters of Great Britain
Shooters at the 1984 Summer Olympics
Sportspeople from Pontefract